The following highways are numbered 66:

Australia
  Barkly Highway (Northern Territory)
   Riddoch Highway

Canada
 Alberta Highway 66
 Highway 66 (Ontario)

Finland
 Kantatie 66 (Orivesi — Lapua)

France
 A66 autoroute

Germany
 Bundesautobahn 66

Greece
 Greek National Road 66, a national highway connecting Nemea with Levidi via Skoteini

Hungary
 66-os főút (Kaposvár - Pécs)

India
  National Highway 66 (India)

Ireland
 N66

Israel
 Highway 66 (Israel)

Malaysia
 Malaysia Federal Route 66

Philippines
 N66 highway (Philippines)

Slovakia
 Road 66 (Slovakia), from Slovak - Hungarian border at Šahy to Tatras mountain

Spain
 Autovía A-66 (Silver Route)

United Arab Emirates
 E 66

United Kingdom
 A66 road
 M66 motorway

United States

 Interstate 66, a highway connecting Interstate 81 in Virginia to Washington, D.C.
 Interstate 66 (Kansas–Kentucky), a former proposed highway to connect Kansas with Kentucky
 U.S. Route 66, the most common meaning. Since 1985, when US 66 was decommissioned, several states where US 66 passed have re-commissioned  part of the former route in that state as a state route 66. In the list of state routes 66 below, those marked with an asterisk (*) have a connection with the former US 66.
 Alabama State Route 66
 Arizona State Route 66*
 Arkansas Highway 66
 California State Route 66*
 County Route 66 (California)*
 Colorado State Highway 66
 Connecticut Route 66
 Florida State Road 66
 Georgia State Route 66
 Hawaii Route 66
 Idaho State Highway 66
 Illinois Route 66 is now Illinois 126*
 Indiana State Road 66
 Iowa Highway 66
 K-66 (Kansas highway)*
 Kentucky Route 66
 Louisiana Highway 66
 Maryland Route 66
 Massachusetts Route 66
 M-66 (Michigan highway)
 Minnesota State Highway 66
 County Road 66 (Hennepin County, Minnesota)
 Missouri Route 66*
 Missouri Route 66 (1922), a pre-1926 highway not connected to US 66
 Montana Highway 66
 Nebraska Highway 66
 Nebraska Spur 66A
 Nebraska Spur 66C
 Nebraska Spur 66D
 Nebraska Spur 66E
 Nevada State Route 66 (former)
 New Jersey Route 66
 New York State Route 66
County Route 66A (Cayuga County, New York)
County Route 66B (Cayuga County, New York)
 County Route 66 (Chautauqua County, New York)
 County Route 66 (Dutchess County, New York)
 County Route 66 (Jefferson County, New York)
 County Route 66 (Monroe County, New York)
 County Route 66 (Onondaga County, New York)
 County Route 66 (Putnam County, New York)
 County Route 66 (Rensselaer County, New York)
 County Route 66 (Saratoga County, New York)
 County Route 66 (Schoharie County, New York)
 County Route 66 (Suffolk County, New York)
 County Route 66 (Sullivan County, New York)
County Route 66A (Westchester County, New York)
 North Carolina Highway 66
 North Dakota Highway 66
 Ohio State Route 66
 Oklahoma State Highway 66*
 Oklahoma State Highway 66B*
 Oregon Route 66
 Pennsylvania Route 66
  Puerto Rico Highway 66
 South Carolina Highway 66
 Tennessee State Route 66
 Texas State Highway 66 (no connection to Texas portion of US 66)
 Texas State Highway Loop 66 (former)
 Texas State Highway Spur 66
 Farm to Market Road 66
 Texas Park Road 66
 U.S. Virgin Islands Highway 66
 Utah State Route 66
 Vermont Route 66
 Virginia State Route 66 (former)
 West Virginia Route 66
 Wisconsin Highway 66

See also
A66 (disambiguation)